National Commission for Allied and Healthcare Professions (NCAHP) is an upcoming Indian regulatory body of Allied and Healthcare Professional. It covers all allied healthcare professions who were not covered under National Medical Commission, Dental Council of India, Indian Nursing Council, Pharmacy Council of India etc till 2021 and club all into 10 categories with power to regulate education and professionals of all 10 categories.

Recognised categories 
Medical Laboratory and Life Sciences
Trauma, Burn Care and Surgical/ Anesthesia related technology
Physiotherapy Professional
Nutrition Science Professional
Ophthalmic Sciences Professional
Occupational Therapy Professional
Community Care, Behavioural Health Sciences and other Professionals
Medical Radiology, Imaging and Therapeutic Technology Professional
Medical Technologists and Physician Associate
Health Information Management and Health Informatic Professional

See also 
 National Medical Commission
 Dental Council of India
 Indian Nursing Council
 Pharmacy Council of India

References 

Medical education in India
Regulatory agencies of India
Medical regulation in India
College accreditors in India
Organisations based in Delhi
Health law in India
Ministry of Health and Family Welfare